Peterlin is a surname. Notable people with the surname include:

Anton Peterlin (physicist) (1908–1993), Slovene physicist
Anton Peterlin (soccer) (born 1987), American soccer player
Ernest Peterlin (1903–1946), Slovene military officer
Margaret Peterlin (born 1970), American lawyer and United States Navy veteran